Entomology is the scientific study of insects, a branch of zoology. In the past the term "insect" was less specific, and historically the definition of entomology would also include the study of animals in other arthropod groups, such as arachnids, myriapods, and crustaceans. This wider meaning may still be encountered in informal use.

Like several of the other fields that are categorized within zoology, entomology is a taxon-based category; any form of scientific study in which there is a focus on insect-related inquiries is, by definition, entomology. Entomology therefore overlaps with a cross-section of topics as diverse as molecular genetics, behavior, neuroscience, biomechanics, biochemistry, systematics, physiology, developmental biology, ecology, morphology, and paleontology.

Over 1.3 million insect species have been described, more than two-thirds of all known species. Some insect species date back to around 400 million years ago. They have many kinds of interactions with humans and other forms of life on Earth.

History

Entomology is rooted in nearly all human cultures from prehistoric times, primarily in the context of agriculture (especially biological control and beekeeping).  The natural philosopher Pliny the Elder, (23 - 79 AD) wrote a book on the kinds of Insects, while the scientist of Kufa, Ibn al-A‘rābī (760 - 845 AD) wrote a book on flies, Kitāb al-Dabāb. However scientific study in the modern sense began only relatively recently, in the 16th century. Ulisse Aldrovandi's De Animalibus Insectis (Of Insect Animals) was published in 1602. Microscopist Jan Swammerdam published History of Insects correctly describing the reproductive organs of insects and metamorphosis. In 1705, Maria Sibylla Merian published a book Metamorphosis Insectorum Surinamensium about the tropical insects of Dutch Surinam.

Early entomological works associated with the naming and classification of species followed the practice of maintaining cabinets of curiosity, predominantly in Europe. This collecting fashion led to the formation of natural history societies, exhibitions of private collections, and journals for recording communications and the documentation of new species. Many of the collectors tended to be from the aristocracy and it spawned off a trade involving collectors around the world and traders. This has been called the "era of heroic entomology." William Kirby is widely considered as the father of entomology in England. In collaboration with William Spence, he published a definitive entomological encyclopedia, Introduction to Entomology, regarded as the subject's foundational text. He also helped to found the Royal Entomological Society in London in 1833, one of the earliest such societies in the world; earlier antecedents, such as the Aurelian society date back to the 1740s. In the late 19th century, the growth of agriculture, and colonial trade, spawned off the "era of economic entomology" which created the professional entomologist associated with the rise of the university and training in the field of biology.

Entomology developed rapidly in the 19th and 20th centuries, and was studied by large numbers of people, including such notable figures as Charles Darwin, Jean-Henri Fabre, Vladimir Nabokov, Karl von Frisch (winner of the 1973 Nobel Prize in Physiology or Medicine), and two-time Pulitzer Prize winner E. O. Wilson.

There has also been a history of people becoming entomologists through museum curation and research assistance, such as Sophie Lutterlough at the Smithsonian National Museum of Natural History. Insect identification is an increasingly common hobby, with butterflies and dragonflies being the most popular.

Most insects can easily be recognized to order such as Hymenoptera (bees, wasps, and ants) or Coleoptera (beetles).  However, identifying to genus or species is usually only possible through the use of identification keys and monographs. Because the class Insecta contains a very large number of species (over 330,000 species of beetles alone) and the characteristics separating them are unfamiliar, and often subtle (or invisible without a microscope), this is often very difficult even for a specialist. This has led to the development of automated species identification systems targeted on insects, for example, Daisy, ABIS, SPIDA and Draw-wing.

In pest control
In 1994, the Entomological Society of America launched a new professional certification program for the pest control industry called the Associate Certified Entomologist (ACE). To qualify as a "true entomologist" an individual would normally require an advanced degree, with most entomologists pursuing a PhD. While not true entomologists in the traditional sense, individuals who attain the ACE certification may be referred to as ACEs or Associate Certified Entomologists.

Subdisciplines

Many entomologists specialize in a single order or even a family of insects, and a number of these subspecialties are given their own informal names, typically (but not always) derived from the scientific name of the group:
 Coleopterology – beetles.
 Dipterology – flies.
 Odonatology – dragonflies and damselflies.
 Hemipterology – true bugs.
 Isopterology – termites.
 Lepidopterology – moths and butterflies.
 Melittology (or Apiology) – bees.
 Myrmecology – ants
 Orthopterology – grasshoppers, crickets, etc.
 Trichopterology – caddisflies.
 Vespology – Social wasps.

Entomologists

Organizations
Like other scientific specialties, entomologists have a number of local, national, and international organizations. There are also many organizations specializing in specific subareas.
 Amateur Entomologists' Society
 Entomological Society of America
 Entomological Society of Canada
 Entomological Society of Japan
 Entomologischer Verein Krefeld
 Entomological Society of India
 International Union for the Study of Social Insects
 Netherlands Entomological Society
 Royal Belgian Entomological Society
 Royal Entomological Society of London
 Russian Entomological Society
 Senckenberg Deutsches Entomologisches Institut
 Société entomologique de France
 Australian Entomological Society
 Entomological Society of New Zealand

Research collection
Here is a list of selected very large insect collections, housed in museums, universities, or research institutes.

Asia
 Zoological Survey of India
 Insect Museum, Tamil Nadu Agricultural University, Coimbatore, Tamil Nadu, India
 National Pusa Collection, Division of Entomology, Indian Agricultural Research Institute, New Delhi, India
 Pakistan Museum of Natural History Garden Avenue, Shakarparian, Islamabad, Pakistan
 Museum Zoologicum Bogoriense, Indonesia

Africa
 Natal Museum, Pietermaritzburg, South Africa

Australasia 

 Lincoln University Entomology Research Collection, Lincoln, New Zealand
 Museum of New Zealand Te Papa Tongarewa, Wellington, New Zealand
 New Zealand Arthropod Collection, Landcare Research Manaaki Whenua, Auckland, New Zealand

Europe
 Bavarian State Collection of Zoology, Zoologische Staatssammlung München
 Museu de Ciències Naturals de Barcelona, Barcelona, Spain
 Muséum national d'histoire naturelle, Paris, France
 Museum für Naturkunde, Berlin, Germany
 Kelvingrove Art Gallery, Glasgow, Scotland
 Natural History Museum, Budapest Hungarian Natural History Museum
 Natural History Museum, Geneva
 Natural History Museum, Leiden, the Netherlands
 Natural History Museum, London, United Kingdom
 Natural History Museum, Oslo Norway
 Natural History Museum, St. Petersburg Zoological Collection of the Russian Academy of Science
 Naturhistorisches Museum, Vienna, Austria
 Oxford University Museum of Natural History, Oxford
 Royal Museum for Central Africa, Brussels, Belgium
 Swedish Museum of Natural History, Stockholm, Sweden
 World Museum Liverpool, the Bug House

United States
 Academy of Natural Sciences of Philadelphia
 American Museum of Natural History, New York City
 Auburn University Museum of Natural History, Auburn, Alabama
 Audubon Insectarium, New Orleans
 Bohart Museum of Entomology, Davis, California
 California Academy of Sciences, San Francisco
 Carnegie Museum of Natural History, Pittsburgh
 Cleveland Museum of Natural History, Cleveland
 Entomology Research Museum, University of California, Riverside
 Essig Museum of Entomology, Berkeley, California
 Field Museum of Natural History, Chicago
 Florida Museum of Natural History, University of Florida, Gainesville, Florida
 Illinois Natural History Survey, Champaign, Illinois
 J. Gordon Edwards Museum, San Jose, California
 Museum of Comparative Zoology, Cambridge, Massachusetts
 Natural History Museum of Los Angeles County, Los Angeles
 National Museum of Natural History, Washington, D.C.
 New Mexico State University Arthropod Museum
 North Carolina State University Insect Museum, Raleigh, North Carolina
 Peabody Museum of Natural History, New Haven, Connecticut
 San Diego Natural History Museum, San Diego, California
 The National Museum of Play, Rochester, N.Y.
 Texas A&M University, College Station, Texas
 University of Minnesota, St. Paul campus (UMSP), Minnesota
 University of Kansas Natural History Museum, Lawrence, Kansas
 University of Nebraska State Museum, Lincoln, Nebraska
 University of Missouri Enns Entomology Museum, University of Missouri, Columbia, Missouri

Canada
 Canadian Museum of Nature, Ottawa, Ontario
 Canadian National Collection of Insects, Arachnids and Nematodes, Ottawa, Ontario
 E.H. Strickland Entomological Museum, University of Alberta, Edmonton, Alberta
 Lyman Entomological Museum, Macdonald Campus of McGill University, Sainte-Anne-de-Bellevue, Quebec
 Montreal Insectarium, Montreal, Quebec
 Newfoundland Insectarium, Reidville, Newfoundland and Labrador
 Royal Alberta Museum, Edmonton, Alberta
 Royal Ontario Museum, Toronto, Ontario
 University of Guelph Insect Collection, Guelph, Ontario
 Victoria Bug Zoo, Victoria, British Columbia
 J. B. Wallis / R. E. Roughley Museum of Entomology,  Winnipeg, Manitoba

See also 

 Arachnology
 Carcinology
 Cultural entomology
 Ethnoentomology
 Forensic entomology
 Forensic entomologist
 Forensic entomology and the law
 Insect thermoregulation
 Insects on stamps
 List of entomological journals
 Medical entomology
 Myriapodology
 Timeline of entomology – 1800–1850
 Timeline of entomology – 1850–1900
 Timeline of entomology since 1900

References

Further reading 

 Chiang, H.C. and G. C. Jahn 1996.  Entomology in the Cambodia-IRRI-Australia Project. (in Chinese) Chinese Entomol. Soc. Newsltr. (Taiwan) 3: 9–11.
 Davidson, E. 2006. Big Fleas Have Little Fleas: How Discoveries of Invertebrate Diseases Are Advancing Modern Science University of Arizona Press, Tucson, 208 pages, .
 Cedric Gillot:  Entomology. Second Edition, Plenum Press, New York, NY / London 1995, .
 Triplehorn, Charles A. and Norman F. Johnson (2005-05-19). Borror and DeLong's Introduction to the Study of Insects, 7th edition, Thomas Brooks/Cole. . — a classic textbook in North America.
 
 Capinera, JL (editor). 2008. Encyclopedia of Entomology, 2nd Edition. Springer.

External links 

 
Subfields of arthropodology